Kingsthorne, also known as King's Thorn, is a village in Herefordshire, England, in Much Birch parish between Hereford and Ross-on-Wye, adjacent to the A49 and A466 roads.

As the land use within the village is almost entirely residential, most services are located outside the village. The primary school catering for approximately 200 pupils is between Kingsthorne and Much Birch. The village is part of the Wormelow Hundred benefice, with its church in Little Birch. The Castle Inn is in the heart of the village.

References

External links

 Much Birch parish website

Villages in Herefordshire